Merrill is a city in Klamath County, Oregon, United States. The population was 844 at the 2010 census.

Merrill is an agricultural area and is home to an annual Potato Festival. The area was also part of the Klamath Basin water crisis pitting agricultural interests against endangered species water requirements, tribal interests, and environmentalists.

Merrill was the birthplace and boyhood home of Carl Barks, the Disney comics artist who created Scrooge McDuck, among other characters. It is home to the Raiders of Lost River Jr./Sr. High School.

Geography
It is along Oregon Route 39 southeast of Klamath Falls and northwest of Tulelake. Lower Klamath Lake and Tule Lake, both in California, are slightly south of Merrill.

The Lost River flows by Merrill. Mount Shasta in the Cascade Range southwest of Merrill, although it lies across the California state line, is visible from the city.

Climate
The region experiences warm (but not hot) and dry summers, with no average monthly temperatures above .  According to the Köppen Climate Classification system, Merrill has a warm-summer Mediterranean climate, abbreviated "Csb" on climate maps.

History
Merrill was named for rancher Nathan S. Merrill, who settled at this location in 1890. A post office was established in Merrill in 1896. H. E. Momyre was the postmaster. The first business in Merrill was a grist mill.

Economy
As of 2002, the five largest employers in Merrill were the Malin Potato Coop, Klamath County Public Schools, the Martin Food Center, the Merrill Grain and Feed Center, and Country Boy Meats.

Demographics

2010 census
As of the census of 2010, there were 844 people, 308 households, and 221 families residing in the city. The racial makeup of the city was 70.9% White, 0.1% African American, 1.5% Native American, 23.8% from other races, and 3.7% from two or more races. Hispanic or Latino of any race were 43.1% of the population.

There were 308 households, of which 40.3% had children under the age of 18 living with them, 52.6% were married couples living together, 13.6% had a female householder with no husband present, 5.5% had a male householder with no wife present, and 28.2% were non-families. 24.4% of all households were made up of individuals, and 7.8% had someone living alone who was 65 years of age or older. The average household size was 2.73 and the average family size was 3.23.

The median age in the city was 35.7 years. 29% of residents were under the age of 18; 10% were between the ages of 18 and 24; 21.8% were from 25 to 44; 26.6% were from 45 to 64; and 12.6% were 65 years of age or older. The gender makeup of the city was 50.7% male and 49.3% female.

2000 census
As of the census of 2000, there were 897 people, 344 households, and 230 families residing in the city. The population density was 2,045.4 people per square mile (787.1/km2). There were 380 housing units at an average density of 866.5 per square mile (333.5/km2). The racial makeup of the city was 73.13% White, 0.11% African American, 1.00% Native American, 0.22% Asian, 19.18% from other races, 6.35% from two or more races; 33.44% of the population were Hispanic  or Latino of any race.

There were 344 households, out of which 34.6% had children under the age of 18 living with them, 52.0% were married couples living together, 10.8% had a female householder with no husband present, 33.1% were non-families, 27.9% of all households were made up of individuals, and 11.9% had someone living alone who was 65 years of age or older.

The average household size was 2.61 and the average family size was 3.22. The age distribution was
28.4% under the age of 18, 8.1% from 18 to 24, 29.2% from 25 to 44, 18.4% from 45 to 64, and 15.8% who were 65 years of age or older. The median age was 35 years. For every 100 females, there were 92.5 males. For every 100 females age 18 and over, there were 87.2 males.

The median income for a household in the city was $23,304, and the median income for a family was $27,639. Males had a median income of $26,250 versus $19,583 for females. The per capita income for the city was $11,803. Approximately 19.9% of families and 24.0% of the population were below the poverty line, including 32.0% of those under age 18 and 12.0% of those age 65 or over.

References

External links
 Entry for Merrill in the Oregon Blue Book

Cities in Oregon
Cities in Klamath County, Oregon
1903 establishments in Oregon
Populated places established in 1903